Eitel Friedrich the younger of Zollern (1454 – Montfoort, 27 June 1490) was a German nobleman who served as Admiral of the Netherlands.

He was the third son of Jobst Nikolaus I, Count of Hohenzollern (1433–1488) and Agnes of Werdenberg-Heiligenberg (1434–1467).

Eitel Friedrich followed Maximilian of Austria to the Low Countries to fight against the Flemish rebellion.
In 1488, he succeeded Philip of Cleves, Lord of Ravenstein as Admiral of the Netherlands, because Cleves had defected to the rebels.

Eitel Friedrich died during the siege of Montfoort. Two of his brothers had died in battle before him.
He was succeeded by Cornelis of Glymes.

Bibliography 
 Sven Rabeler, Niederadlige Lebensformen im späten Mittelalter: Wilwolt von Schaumberg p. 188

1454 births
1490 deaths
15th-century German people
Eitel Friedrich
Medieval German military personnel
Sons of monarchs